Esperadinha Airport  was a public use airport located near the hamlet of Esperadinha, northwestern Brava, Cape Verde. It opened in 1992 and operated until 2004, when it was closed due to persistent dangerous high winds.

See also
List of airports in Cape Verde

References

External links 
 Airport record for Esperadinha Airport at Landings.com

Airports in Cape Verde
Brava, Cape Verde
Defunct airports